Bitivada or Bitiwada is a village located in Parvathipuram Manyam district on the banks of River Nagavali. It belongs to Veeraghattam mandal, formerly part of Palakonda taluq.

Demographics
 India census, the demographic details of this village was as follows:
 Total Population: 	2,785 in 652 Households.
 Male Population: 	1,351
 Female Population: 	1,434
 Children Under 6-years of age: 394 (Boys - 185 and Girls - 209)
 Total Literates: 	1,076

References

Villages in Parvathipuram Manyam district